Fortitudo Pallacanestro Bologna history and statistics in FIBA Europe and Euroleague Basketball (company) competitions.

European competitions

Record 
Fortitudo Pallacanestro Bologna has overall from 1976-77 (first participation) to 2008-09 (last participation): 173 wins against 111 defeats plus 2 draws in 286 games for all the European club competitions.
 EuroLeague: 133–86 (219).
 EuroCup Basketball: 6–10 (16).
 FIBA Korać Cup: 34–15 plus 2 draws (51).

External links 
FIBA Europe
Euroleague
ULEB
Eurocup

Basketball teams in Emilia-Romagna
Sport in Bologna